Blood-C is a Japanese animated television series which aired for twelve episodes between July 8 and September 30, 2011. The third project in the Blood franchise, the series follows Saya Kisaragi as she fights monsters called the Elder Bairns. It was directed by Tsutomu Mizushima and produced by Production I.G. The characters were designed by manga artist group CLAMP, while Kazuchika Kise handled the animation character design and Takayuki Goto was the chief animation director for the series. All episodes were co-written by CLAMP member Nanase Ohkawa and Blood+ director Junichi Fujisaku.

Blood-C premiered in the late night slot on Mainichi Broadcasting System (MBS) and Tokyo Broadcasting System (TBS). It was livestreamed simultaneously in North America, the United Kingdom, Canada, Australia, New Zealand and South Africa through the Western branch of Niconico. Other channels that showed Blood-C in 2011 were Chubu-Nippon Broadcasting and Kumamoto Asahi Broadcasting's RRK station. WOWOW ran a marathon broadcast between September 22 and 29, 2013, followed by its sequel film Blood-C: The Last Dark and the original Blood: The Last Vampire film.

The series' home video releases on Blu-ray and DVD were published in Japan by Aniplex. The series released in six volumes between September 28, 2011 and February 22, 2012. The series' English dub and North American licensing was handled by Funimation. A box set containing the whole series released for Blu-ray and DVD on January 22, 2013. In Australia, the series was licensed by Madman Entertainment, releasing as a box set for DVD and Blu-ray on April 17, 2013. In Europe, the series was distributed by Anchor Bay Entertainment through Manga Entertainment. It released as a box set on DVD and Blu-ray on June 10, 2013.


Episode list

References

External links

Blood: The Last Vampire
Blood-C